Henry A. Smith (July 23, 1893 in Lancaster, New York – February 3, 1985 in Buffalo, New York) was an offense linemen in the National Football League (NFL) for six seasons.

Playing career 

From the 1920 to 1925 seasons, Smith played nearly his entire career for the Rochester Jeffersons. He also played four games for the Rock Island Independents in 1923. He played left guard for Rochester during his first two seasons, before switching to right tackle for his third. From 1923 to 1925, he played center.

References

External links 
Hank Smith's profile at Sports Reference.com

1893 births
1985 deaths
Rochester Jeffersons players
Rock Island Independents players
People from Lancaster, New York
Players of American football from New York (state)